The 1914 International cricket season was from April 1914 to August 1914. The season consists with English domestic season.

Season overview

June

South Africa in England

July

Scotland in Ireland

References

1914 in cricket